Ba Đồn is a town (thị xã) in Quảng Bình Province, Vietnam. The town is equal to a huyện and is located on National Route 1, about 40 km north of the provincial capital, Đồng Hới. The township is the commercial and service centre serving surrounding rural areas. Ba Đồn was incorporated into a 3rd municipality (town or thị xã) including some neighboring communes of Quảng Trạch District on December 20, 2013.

Ba Đồn has an area of 163.1828 km2 and its population in 2013 was 115,196. In 2012, Ba Đồn was recognised as a class IV municipality.

Administrative subdivisions
Ba Don Town includes 6 urban wards (phường):
Ba Đồn
Quảng Thọ
Quảng Long
Quảng Thuận
Quảng Phong 
Quảng Phúc

10 rural communes (xã):
Quảng Minh
Quảng Sơn
Quảng Thủy
Quảng Hòa
Quảng Lộc
Quảng Văn
Quảng Tân
Quảng Trung
Quảng Tiên
Quảng Hải

Notes

Districts of Quảng Bình province
Populated places in Quảng Bình province
County-level towns in Vietnam